The Seattle Mariners 1994 season was their 18th since the franchise creation, and ended the season finishing 3rd in the American League West, finishing with a  record. The season was cut short by the infamous 1994 player's strike, which began on August 12.

The Mariners played their final twenty games on the road, due to interior ceiling repairs at the Kingdome; they were 10–1 in August, and won their final six games.

Offseason
November 2, 1993: Bret Boone was traded with Erik Hanson to the Cincinnati Reds for Dan Wilson and Bobby Ayala.
December 10, 1993: Eric Anthony was traded by the Houston Astros for Mike Felder and Mike Hampton.
 December 20, 1993: Félix Fermín was traded by the Cleveland Indians with Reggie Jefferson and cash for Omar Vizquel.
January 10, 1994: Luis Sojo was signed as a free agent.
January 31, 1994: Bobby Thigpen was signed as a free agent.
February 15, 1994: Jerry Willard was signed as a free agent.

Regular season
April 4: The Mariners played in the first game at Cleveland's Jacobs Field. President Bill Clinton threw out the ceremonial first pitch, and the Indians won 4–3 in 11 innings.
June 17: In the Mariners' 65th game of the season, Ken Griffey Jr. hit his league-leading 30th home run off Kansas City Royals ace David Cone in a 5–1 win at Kauffman Stadium.
July 8: Shortstop Alex Rodriguez made his major league debut at age 18. It was at Fenway Park against the Boston Red Sox; Rodriguez was flawless in the field, but went hitless in three at bats. He got his first major league hit the following day.

By Friday, August 12, the Mariners had compiled a  record through 112 games and were only two games behind the Texas Rangers for the lead in the four-team AL West Division. They had scored 569 runs (5.08 per game) and allowed 616 runs (5.50 per game).

Slightly more than half of the 162 games scheduled were to be televised this season, with 72 on KSTW and sixteen on Prime Sports Northwest; of those 88 games, 65 were on the road and 23 at home.

Opening day starters
Rich Amaral
Eric Anthony
Mike Blowers
Chris Bosio
Jay Buhner
Félix Fermín
Ken Griffey Jr.
Tino Martinez
Greg Pirkl
Dan Wilson

Season standings

Record vs. opponents

Transactions
April 1: Torey Lovullo was selected off waivers from the California Angels.
April 3: Goose Gossage was signed as a free agent.
April 29: Bobby Thigpen was released.
May 6: Mackey Sasser was released.
June 2: Jason Varitek was selected in the first round (14th pick) of the 1994 amateur draft, and signed April 20, 1995.

Roster

Player stats

Batting
Note: Pos = Position; G = Games played; AB = At bats; H = Hits; Avg. = Batting average; HR = Home runs; RBI = Runs batted in

Other batters
Note: G = Games played; AB = At bats; H = Hits; Avg. = Batting average; HR = Home runs; RBI = Runs batted in

Starting pitchers
Note: G = Games pitched; IP = Innings pitched; W = Wins; L = Losses; ERA = Earned run average; SO = Strikeouts

Other pitchers
Note: G = Games pitched; IP = Innings pitched; W = Wins; L = Losses; ERA = Earned run average; SO = Strikeouts

Relief pitchers
Note: G = Games pitched; W = Wins; L = Losses; SV = Saves; ERA = Earned run average; SO = Strikeouts

Farm system

References

External links
1994 Seattle Mariners at Baseball Reference
1994 Seattle Mariners team page at www.baseball-almanac.com

Seattle Mariners seasons
Seattle Marin
Seattle Mariners